Pierre Quétineau (1756 – 17 March 1794) was a general officer in the Army of the Coasts of La Rochelle during the War in the Vendée.

Career
In command in the Vendée at the time of the War in the Vendée, he was attacked by superior forces at the town of Bressuire whose walls were in ruins and unable to hold off an assault; he retreated to Thouars. In the Battle of Thouars on 5 May 1793 the Vendean rebels captured the town and took him and his troops prisoner. He and his captured troops were released but when he reached Saumur he was arrested and thrown into prison. When the rebels also won the Battle of Saumur he fell into their hands again. The Royalist generals asked him  to join them, pointing out that the National Convention would not forgive his defeat. Nevertheless, Pierre Quétineau left to rejoin his army. He was judged by the Revolutionary Tribunal, condemned to death, and guillotined on 17 March 1794.  His wife, Jeanne Robert Latreille appeared at the trial of Jacques Hébert and the Hébertists, and was also later guillotined in 1794.

1756 births
1794 deaths
French generals
Military leaders of the French Revolutionary Wars
Republican military leaders of the War in the Vendée
French people executed by guillotine during the French Revolution